Nguyễn Ngọc Thành, Ph.D., D.Sc. is a Vietnamese informatician at the Wroclaw University of Technology, Poland, and is the head of Department of Applied Informatics in the Faculty of Computer Science and Telecommunication Technology.

References
GS.TSKH Nguyễn Ngọc Thành: Muốn sinh viên được đào tạo tiến sĩ ở nước ngoài - Phóng sự - Ký sự - Thể thao & Văn hóa
Niềm tự hào của GS.TS Việt kiều Balan Nguyễn Ngọc Thành
ACIIDS 2010 và triển vọng hợp tác giữa Đại học Huế với ĐH Công nghệ Wroclaw - Ba lan 
Một người gốc Việt thành danh ở Đông Âu
Người nhận danh hiệu “Nhà khoa học xuất sắc” trong lĩnh vực công nghệ thông tin-máy tính

External links
Nguyen's Homepage

1963 births
Living people
Academic staff of the Wrocław University of Science and Technology
Vietnamese expatriates in Poland
People from Quảng Bình province
Vietnamese academics